Raspopinskaya is a rural locality (a stanitsa) and the administrative center of Raskopinskoye Rural Settlement, Kletsky District, Volgograd Oblast, Russia. The population was 1,271 as of 2010. There are 28 streets.

Geography 
Raspopinskaya is located 20 km northwest of Kletskaya (the district's administrative centre) by road. Bazki is the nearest rural locality.

References 

Rural localities in Kletsky District